The list of Current and past members from the Uttar Pradesh Legislative Council State. State elect members for the term of 6 years. 38 members are indirectly elected by the state legislators. 36 members are elected from Local Authorities Constituency, 8 from Graduates Constituency and 8 from Teachers Constituency. Governor of Uttar Pradesh nominated up to 10 members from eminent people from various fields.

Alphabetical List of all Members of Legislative Council from Uttar Pradesh State 
Alphabetical List by Last Name

The list is Incomplete.
 Star (*) Represents current members from UP State.
 MLA - Members of Legislative Assembly ( of Uttar Pradesh State )
 LA - Local Authorities'
 GR - Graduates'
 TA - Teachers' 

 NOM - Nominated by Governor

 NOM - Nominated by Governor of Uttar Pradesh State.

References

 
Lists of people from Uttar Pradesh
Lists of state legislators of Indian States
Uttar Pradesh politics-related lists